Buttonsberry is an unincorporated community located in McLean County, Kentucky, United States. It was also known as Karnes Station. The etymology refers to finding a button nearby while picking berries.

References

Unincorporated communities in McLean County, Kentucky
Unincorporated communities in Kentucky